Philip Reid Shawe "Phil" (born August 19, 1969) is an American business person. He is the co-founder and current CEO of TransPerfect. He has overseen the day-to-day operations of the company since its founding in 1992. Shawe was named Entrepreneur of the Year for New York City by Ernst & Young and named to Crain's New York “40 Under 40 list” as one of the top young executives in New York.

Biography
Shaw was born in 1969 to Shirley and Irvin Shawe in Kentucky. He attended New York University. While at NYU, he and Elizabeth Elting founded TransPerfect.

Career
Shawe began his career after graduating NYU with a position at Chemical Bank in New York. When Chemical Banking Corporation merged with Manufacturers Hanover Corp. in 1991, Shawe quit to join Elting in a new translation service business.

From 1992 until 2018, Shawe had been the co-CEO of TransPerfect. Transperfect had grown every quarter since its founding. Since May 2018, he has been the sole CEO.

In 2019, Shawe announced that TransPerfect will move the company's Manhattan headquarters from 3 Park Avenue to Eyal Ofer's NoMad Tower.

TransPerfect Legal Challenge

Beginning in 2014, TransPerfect's two co-founders became entangled in a legal fight for control of the company. Since the founding of the company, Shawe and Elting had repeatedly clashed. Shawe attempted to have Elting criminally prosecuted, and, after Elting ended their engagement, repeatedly crawled under her bed and refused to leave. Shawe began monitoring Elting's emails, directing employees to monitor Elting's phone calls, and downloading her emails after breaking into her office and removing her personal computer. Shawe repeatedly provided false testimony in later litigation to conceal this conduct. Shawe hired a personal assistant tasked with repeatedly breaking into Elting's office and steal documents. Shawe falsified corporate records to avoid Elting's review. On her part, Elting refused to pay litigation counsel to defend the company against a patent infringement suit.

Elting and Shawe filed several suits against each other, each seeking injunctive relief and restructuring of TransPerfect.

Elting's action in New York's state courts was ultimately dismissed.

Shawe and Elting's dispute in Delaware Chancery Court set a significant precedent in corporate law. Elting sought a forced sale of the company based on Delaware statutory law. Following significant mediation, and a $300 million offer from Shawe to purchase Elting's shares,  Chancellor Andre Bouchard found that the directors of the company were irreparably deadlocked, and that, because both of them effectively held half of the company's shares, the only viable remedy was the appointment of a custodian and a forced sale.

In 2016, Chancellor Bouchard sanctioned Shawe for destroying evidence in the case. Bouchard noted that no evidence was actually lost, but the attempt resulted in a $7.1 million fine.

Elting's attorneys at the firm Kramer Levin were also sanctioned for obstruction during a deposition during the case.

Ultimately, Shawe bought Elting's shares for $385 million. Shawe therefore became the sole owner of TransPerfect.

Shawe has been outspoken on what he considers to be corruption in the Chancery Court. Once he became the sole owner of Transperfect, Shawe moved all of his corporate holdings from Delaware to Nevada. Corporate law professors and corporate lawyers have characterized Shawe as a "vindictive litigant" who engaged "in a spiteful personal vendetta" via a public attack ad campaign against Chancellor Brouchard following Bouchard's decision to order a sale.

In December 2021, Martin Russo, an attorney for Shawe, sent a cease-and-desist letter to the Social Science Research Network, demanding that the website remove an article by Ann Lipton, a law professor at Tulane University. The article recounted, via citations to Delaware court findings, how Shawe was alleged to have hid under Elting's bed after she had broken off their engagement, stalked her on an international flight, broken into her office and copied her hard drive, and gained access to Elting's emails, including privileged communications with her attorneys. Claims, Shawe vehemently denied. Lipton suggested that Shawe's behavior was an example of gender discrimination in business. The Social Science Research Network subsequently removed the paper, although it later restored the article and announced a review of its internal policies regarding attempts to "deplatform or cancel" academic articles. Lipton's paper was later published in the Houston Law Review.

Affiliations and Philanthropy

Shawe has guest lectured on Entrepreneurship at New York University and Columbia University and is a member of the Association for a Better New York (ABNY). He had been a member of the board of directors of The Joyful Heart Foundation, a non-profit that worked in support of survivors of sexual assault, domestic violence, and child abuse. His philanthropic efforts include supporting over 25 causes by donating time or financial support, and he was recently named to The V Foundation for Cancer Research's Circle of Honor.

In 2018, Shawe sponsored ultramarathon runner Michele Graglia to run the Atacama Desert, for which Graglia was accepted into the Guinness Book. Shawe is sponsoring Graglia to run three more deserts - the Gobi, Sahara and Antarctica.

References

External links
 Phil Shawe Website

Living people
1969 births
American businesspeople
People from Kentucky
New York University alumni